The R553 road is a regional road in County Kerry, Ireland. It travels from the N69 road in Listowel to the R551 road near Ballybunion, via Lisselton.

References

Regional roads in the Republic of Ireland
Roads in County Kerry